Ctenusa curvilinea is a moth of the family Noctuidae. The species can be found from Ethiopia and Eritrea south to South Africa.

References 

Catocalinae
Moths described in 1913
Insects of Ethiopia
Fauna of Somalia
Owlet moths of Africa